Charles Egerton (12 March 1654 – 11 December 1717),  of Marchington, Staffordshire, was an English Whig politician who sat in the English and British House of Commons between 1695 and 1711.

Egerton was the fourth son of John Egerton, 2nd Earl of Bridgwater and his wife Elizabeth Cavendish, daughter of William Cavendish, 1st Duke of Newcastle.  He was admitted   at the Middle Temple in 1673 and at Lincoln's Inn in 1678. He married Elizabeth Murray, the daughter and heiress of Henry Murray, Groom of the Bedchamber to Charles I and widow of Randolph Egerton of Betley, Staffordshire on. 30 April 1691. He was the brother of Sir William Egerton.
 
Egerton was returned as Member of Parliament for Brackley, Northamptonshire on the family interest at the  1695 English general election. He voted for fixing the price of guineas at 22 shillings in March 1695, and  voted  for the attainder of Sir John Fenwick on 25 November 1696. At the 1698 English general election,  he was returned again unopposed and was a  Court supporter. He was returned unopposed at the first 1701 election and was returned in a contest at the second 1701 election, and again at the 1702 English general election. At the 1705 English general election he was returned in a contest. He voted  for the Court candidate as Speaker on 25 October 1705 and supported the Court in the proceedings on the ‘place clause’ of the regency bill on 18 February 1706. In 1708 he was returned unopposed as a Whig MP for Brackley. He supported the naturalization of the Palatines. At the 1710 British general election he was returned in a contest, but was unseated on petition  in favour of John Burgh on  27 January 1711.

From 1697 to 1709 Egerton was involved in backing a scheme to pardon the pirates of Madagascar and have them return to England with their considerable plundered wealth. Propagated by former pirate John Breholt, the scheme lost traction after Breholt's piratical past came to light.

Egerton inherited a share of the estates of Aubrey de Vere, 20th Earl of Oxford, who died in March 1703, but later ran into financial difficulties. In 1712 he obtained a private Act of Parliament to sell his manor of Marchington in Staffordshire,  to pay his  debts. He did not stand for Parliament again and    died on 11 December 1717, aged 63.  He and his wife had one son.

References

1654 births
1717 deaths
People from Brackley
English MPs 1695–1698
English MPs 1698–1700
English MPs 1701
English MPs 1701–1702
English MPs 1702–1705
English MPs 1705–1707
Members of the Parliament of Great Britain for English constituencies
British MPs 1707–1708
British MPs 1708–1710
Younger sons of earls